Murasaki is a crater on Mercury located at 12 S, 31 W. It is 132 km in diameter. It was named after 10th-11th century Japanese writer Murasaki Shikibu. The name was approved by IAU's Working Group for Planetary System Nomenclature in 1976. To its east lies the slightly larger Hiroshige. The bright crater Kuiper overlays the rim of Murasaki.

References

Impact craters on Mercury
Murasaki Shikibu